The Algeria national futsal team is controlled by the Algerian Football Federation, the governing body for futsal in Algeria and represents the country in international futsal competitions.

Competitive records

FIFA Futsal World Cup

AMF Futsal World Cup

Africa Futsal Cup of Nations

North African Futsal Cup

Arab Championship

Current squad 
As of 02/11/2010.

References

External links 
 Algerian FA

African national futsal teams
Futsal
National team